The Ryongmun T'an'gwang Line, or Ryongmun Colliery Line is an electrified railway line of the Korean State Railway in Kujang County, North P'yŏngan Province, North Korea, running from Ŏryong on the Manp'o Line to Ryongmun Colliery.

History
Ŏryong Station on the Manp'o Line was opened on 1 May 1941, when the construction of a new line to the coal mines at Ryongmun began; the line, named the Ryongmun Colliery Line, was opened by the Chosen Government Railway on 1 September 1941.

Electrification of the line was completed by 1980.

Route 

A yellow background in the "Distance" box indicates that section of the line is not electrified.

References

Railway lines in North Korea
Standard gauge railways in North Korea